At 23:50 (UTC+8) on 6 February 2018, an earthquake of magnitude 6.4 on the moment magnitude scale hit Taiwan. The epicenter was on the coastline near Hualien, which was the most severely affected area, with a maximum felt intensity of VIII (Severe) on the Mercalli intensity scale. At least 17 deaths were reported, with 285 injured. The maximum foreshock was recorded on 4 February 2018, at 21:56:40. The epicenter was located at Hualien County, Taiwan, reaching a scale of ML 5.8.

Tectonic setting
Taiwan has a history of many strong earthquakes. The island is located within a complex zone of convergence between the Philippine Sea Plate and Eurasian Plate. At the location of the earthquake, these plates converge at a rate of 75 mm per year. To the south of Taiwan, oceanic crust of the Eurasian Plate is subducting beneath the Philippine Sea Plate creating an island arc, the Luzon Arc. At Taiwan the oceanic crust has all been subducted and the arc is colliding with continental crust of the Eurasian Plate. To the north of Taiwan the Philippine Sea Plate is in contrast subducting beneath the Eurasian Plate, forming the Ryukyu Arc.

Earthquake
The earthquake formed the largest of a sequence of events that have affected the area over a period of days, with 11 foreshocks of M 4.6 and greater, starting on 3 February with an M 4.8 earthquake and including an M 6.1 event on 4 February, within a few kilometres of the event that took place on 6 February. 6 February earthquake was a result of oblique-slip faulting.

The earthquake occurred on the second anniversary of the 2016 Taiwan earthquake in Tainan that had killed 117 people.

The earthquake was followed by a series of aftershocks, with the largest being an M 5.7 event on 7 February at 23:21 local time, 19 km northeast of Hualien city, which reached a maximum intensity of VI (strong).

Aftermath

Casualties 
As of 11 February 17 people were reported dead and a further 285 injured. Of the reported fatalities, 9 were from People's Republic of China, 5 from Taiwan, 2 from Hong Kong of Canadian nationality, and 1 from the Philippines. 14 of them were in The Yun Men Tsui Ti building.

Damage 
Many buildings in the city of Hualien were damaged, including four that had partially collapsed or were severely damaged. The lower floors of the Marshal Hotel collapsed, killing two people. 14 deaths were also reported from the twelve-story Yun Men Tsui Ti (雲門翠堤) residential building, which was severely tilted due to the collapse of some of the lower floors. Large beams were placed by cranes on one side of the building in an effort to prevent further tilting during the continuing rescue efforts.

Many homes were left without water. Bridges and highways remaining closed due to damage from the earthquake.

Hundreds of firefighters and military personnel stayed onsite to support efforts to rescue people trapped in damaged buildings.

International response 

The Taiwanese government said that several countries offered to provide aid following the earthquake but stated that it had to "politely decline" such offers, including an offer from People's Republic of China reasoning that Taiwan has no shortage of relief workers and supplies. It decided to accept a Japanese contingent since they possess body-heat detection equipment, a technology Taiwanese authorities do not possess.

The Japanese specialized rescue team arrived on 9 February to provide assistance for the search efforts. The Japanese team was the first international search-and-rescue team to arrive in Taiwan. Singapore also flew in US$103,000 worth of humanitarian supplies to Taiwan through a C-130 Hercules of the Republic of Singapore Air Force.

At least 63 countries, 18 of which have formal diplomatic ties with Taiwan, as well as the European Union, the Organization of Eastern Caribbean States, the Central American Parliament and the Central American Integration System sent condolences to the Taiwanese government.

See also
 List of earthquakes in 2018
 List of earthquakes in Taiwan

References

External links
 
 

Hualien
Hualien
Hualien
Hualien
Hualien County
Hualien City